Maurice Neyt (13 August 1928 – 20 February 2006) was a Belgian racing cyclist. He rode in the 1952 Tour de France.

References

1928 births
2006 deaths
Belgian male cyclists
Place of birth missing
20th-century Belgian people